Clermont-Ferrand Auvergne Airport  is an airport serving the French city of Clermont-Ferrand. It is the main airport of the Auvergne region, the others are Aurillac airport and Le-Puy-en-Velay airport. In 2013, the airport handled 416,600 passengers making it the 29th busiest airport in France.

History

In 1916 the first hard runway was built on this site (now runway 08/26), the first terminal would open at the airport in 1937. The terminal had a size 200m². In 1975 the runway was extended to its current 3,015 m. A year later in 1976 the airport had a category 3 ILS system installed.
The current terminal was built in 1992.

The airport used to be the hub of Regional Airlines, an important regional airline in France.  Regional Airlines was bought by Air France in 2000 and Air France moved Regional's hub (now Hop!) to the airport of Lyon St Exupéry, about a hundred kilometers away.

Over 1 million passengers went to Clermont-Ferrand Auvergne airport in 2002, with more than 30 destinations in France and in Europe. More recently, there were only 14 destinations at the airport and 400,295 passengers in 2015.

Facilities
It has one asphalt paved runway designated 08/26 which measures , plus two grass runways: one parallel to 08/26 which measures  and one designated 01/19 which measures . The passenger terminal is 17 600 m2 large.

Airlines and destinations
The following airlines operate regular scheduled and charter flights to and from Clermont-Ferrand:

Passenger

Cargo

Statistics

Incidents
 On 28 December 1971, Vickers Viscount F-BOEA of Air Inter was damaged beyond economic repair when it departed the runway on a training flight during a simulated failure of #4 engine.
 On 27 October 1972, Air Inter Flight 696, Vickers Viscount 724 F-BMCH, en route from Lyon to Clermont-Ferrand, crashed 4 km west of Noirétable during bad weather; 60 on board died, 8 survived. The subsequent investigation determined that the accident was caused by the flight crew's failure to notice that their plane's radio compass had shifted 180 degrees, most likely the result of electrical discharges in the rainstorm they were flying through. The crew may have followed the erroneous reading as they attempted to fly an approach pattern using Clermont-Ferrand's non-directional beacon (NDB).

References

External links 
 Airport website
 Clermont-Ferrand Auvergne Airport (official site - corporate) 
 Aéroport de Clermont-Ferrand - Auvergne (Union des Aéroports Français) 
 

Airports in Auvergne-Rhône-Alpes
Buildings and structures in Puy-de-Dôme